Labour rights in Azerbaijan. Everyone including foreign and non-citizens has right to work in the Republic of Azerbaijan. Nobody may be deprived of a right to work based on discrimination related to citizenship, sex, race, nationality, language, place of residence, economic standing, social origin, age, family circumstances, religion, political views, affiliation with trade unions or other public associations, professional standing, beliefs, or other similar factors. All persons are free to choose his or her workplace, profession, and activity. Everybody is free to work or not to work. Compulsory labor is forbidden by legislation in force of Azerbaijan. In other words, no one may be forced to work in the country. If one has a status of “unemployed” the state has to pay social allowances to him or her. Furthermore, the state must endeavor to eliminate the unemployment in the country.

Basic rights and obligations of the employees and employers

Rights and obligations of the employees 
Labour relations between an employee and employer are set up as from the time the employment contract carries into force. Labour legislation determines the rights and responsibilities of employees and employers. The workers have right to receive appropriate salary for his or her work and social insurance paid by employer, to work under safety and healthy conditions, to join trade unions or other organization and others. At the same time, the employees have to abstain from the breach of work discipline, occupational safety requirements, disclose of state and trade secrets, and any other that may cause the violation of labor rights and interests of their co-workers.

Rights and obligations of the employers 
Employers have to respect to the rights of employees. They shoulder responsibility to comply with the terms and conditions of the employment contracts, collective agreements and labour legislation in force. All judgments and decisions of judicial or quasi-judicial bodies regarding individual or collective disputes must be executed by employers. Employers have to try to better the social welfare including salary, to establish and maintain safety and healthy work environment, to promote and create equal opportunities for employees only based on their work performance, and to take necessary steps to prevent discrimination, in particular, based on gender and sexual harassment.

Employers have a right to impose disciplinary measures on employees because of the violation of labour legislation in force, and employment contract. Additionally, they are right to claim compensation for damage caused by employees.

Criminal liability for violation of labour legislation 
It is forbidden to force a person to work by intimidation, harassment, use of force, or the restriction of one’s freedom. This action is punished by imprisonment for the term of four to eight years. The punishment may increase, for example, if the same action causes the death of someone.

Infringement of safety precautions regulations or other rules of labor safeties by an appointed person is punished if it causes serious or minor serious harm to health of a person, or the death of a person or persons.

The persons cannot be employed unless the employment contract comes into force. The authorities who are responsible for this have to bear criminal liability under the Criminal Code of Azerbaijan.

Unreasonable termination of employment contract with a woman because of her pregnancy or 3-year-old child who depends on her results in criminal liability. The regulation is the same for a man who brings up his child alone.

International Labour Organization and Azerbaijan 

Azerbaijan became a member of the International Labour Organization in May 1992. The ILO opened its local office in Azerbaijan in 2003. Until the end of September 2017, Azerbaijan has ratified 58 Conventions and 1 Additional Protocol within the framework of the ILO. All fundamental and governance conventions of ILO have been ratified by Azerbaijan. On 18–19 November 2010, Baku, the capital of Azerbaijan, played host to the 3rd Conference of the Regional Alliance of Labour Inspections. The Ministry of Labour and Social Protection of Population of the Republic of Azerbaijan, the International Association of Labour Inspections, the ILO, and the World Bank together organized the Conference.

See also 
 Human rights in Azerbaijan
 Children's rights in Azerbaijan
 Ministry of Labour and Social Protection of the Population
Labor Code of Azerbaijan

References

External links 
 http://www.mlspp.gov.az/en/pages/1
 http://www.ilo.org/moscow/countries/azerbaijan/lang--en/index.htm

International Labour Organization
Law of Azerbaijan
Right to work